Daniel García Andújar (1966 in Almoradí) is a visual media artist, activist and art theorist from Spain. He lives and works in Barcelona. His work has been exhibited widely, including Manifesta 4, the Venice Biennale and documenta 14 Athens, Kassel. He has directed numerous workshops for artists and social collectives worldwide.

Work and contributions 
Andújar is one of the principal exponents of Net.art, founder of Technologies To The People and a member of irational.org. The most prominent projects in this sphere would be the Street Access Machine (1996), a machine allowing those begging in the street to access digital money; The Body Research Machine (1997), an interactive machine that scanned the body's DNA strands, processing them for scientific experiments, and x-devian by knoppix, an open-source operating system presented as part of the Individual Citizen Republic Project: The System (2003) project. Another course the work takes would be the critical reflection on the art world TTTP presents through the Technologies to the People Foundation with its collections distributed free of charge—Photo Collection (1997), Video Collection (1998) and Net Art Classics Collection (1999)—already calling the idea of material and intellectual property into question during this period. Andújar is the director of numerous internet projects, such as e-sevilla, e-valencia, e-madrid  and e-barcelona.

From January to April 2015, the Museo Nacional Centro de Arte Reina Sofía (MNCARS) hosted a comprehensive solo exhibition of his Works curated by Manuel Borja-Villel under the title Operating System. His Work is in major public and private collections, including the Museo Nacional Centro de Arte Reina Sofia's National Collection.

Projects 
 1996–2011: Technologies To The People, began in 1996 is an historical net.art project.
 2003: X-devian. The New Technologies to the People System.
 2004: Postcapital Archive (1989–2001).
 2011: A vuelo de pájaro Let's Democratize Democracy.

Exhibitions 
 2006 – Postcapital, Palau de la Virreina, Barcelona, Spain.
 2008 – Anna Kournikova Deleted By Memeright Trusted System – Art in the Age of Intellectual Property. Postcapital Archive. Hartware MedienKunstVerein, PHOENIX Halle Dortmund, Germany. Curated by: Inke Arns and Francis Hunger
 2008 – Unrecorded, Akbank Sanat, Istanbul, Turkey. Curated by Basak Senova.
 2008 – Herramientas del arte. Relecturas (Tools of Art: Re-readings), Parpalló, Valencia. With Rogelio López Cuenca and Isidoro Valcárcel Medina, Curated by: Álvaro de los Ángeles. Spain.
 2008 -Banquete_nodos y redes. LABoral Centro de Arte y Creación Industrial, Gijón, Curated by: Karin Ohlenschläger. Spain.
 2008 -The Wonderful World of irational.org: Tools, Techniques and Events 1996–2006. Museum of Contemporary Art Vojvodina, Novi Sad. Curators: Inke Arns (Dortmund) and Jacob Lillemose (Kopenhagen). Serbia.
 2009 – Postcapital. Archive 1989–2001,  Württembergischer Kunstverein, Stuttgart. Curated by Iris Dressler and Hans D. Christ.
 2009 – Postcapital (Mauer), Museum for Modern Art, Bremen, Germany. Curated by Dr. Anne Thurmann-Jajes.
 2009 – Subversive Praktiken, Württembergischer Kunstverein, Stuttgart.
 2009 – Postcapital Archive. The Unavowable Community. Catalan Pavilion, 53. Biennale, Venice. Curated by Valentin Roma.
 2009 – Postcapital Archive (1989–2001), Iberia Art Center, Beijing. Curated by Valentin Roma.
 2010 – Postkapital Arşiv 1989–2001 Sedat Yazici Riva Foundation for Education, Culture and Art, Istanbul Curated by Basak Senova.
 2010 – BARCELONA – VALÈNCIA – PALMA. A History of Confluence and Divergence. Objects of desire. Centre de Cultura Contemporània de Barcelona, Spain. Curated by Ignasi Aballí, Melcior Comes and Vicent Sanchis.
 2010 – Postcapital Archive (1989–2001) . Total Museum of Contemporary Art, Seoul, South Korea. Curated by Nathalie Boseul Shin and Hans D. Christ.
 2010 – Postcapital Archive (1989–2001) La comunidad inconfesable, Bòlit, Centre d’Art Contemporani, Girona, Spain. Curated by Valentín Roma.
 2010 – The Wall. Postcapital Archive (1989–2001), Espai Visor, Valencia.
 2015 – Sistema Operativo. Museo Nacional Centro de Arte Reina Sofía. Curated by Manuel Borja-Villel.
 2015 – Naturaleza vigilada / Überwachte Natur, Museo Vostell Malpartida.

Museum Collections 
 Museo Nacional Centro de Arte Reina Sofía, Madrid
 Institut Valencià d'Art Modern (IVAM), Valencia
 Museu d'Art Contemporani de Barcelona (MACBA), Barcelona
 ARTIUM – Basque Museum Center of Contemporary Art, Vitoria-Gasteiz
 Museo de Arte Contemporáneo de Castilla y León (MUSAC), Léon
 CA2M – Centro de Arte Dos de Mayo, Madrid
 Centro de Artes Visuales Helga de Alvear, Cáceres
 Es Baluard Museu d’Art Modern, Palma de Mallorca
 Museu d´Art Jaume Morera, Lleida
 Banco De España, Madrid
 Walker Art CenterMinneapolis, MN
 The Newark MuseumNewark, NJ
 les Abattoirs – FRAC Midi-PyrénéesToulouse

Selected books 
 Hans D. Christ, Iris Dressler (ed.): Technologies To The People. "Postcapital Archive (1989–2001)" Daniel Garcia Andujar, Hatje Cantz Verlag, edited 2011. .
 Daniel G. Andújar, Operating System, Authors: Jacob Lillemose, Iris Dressler, Javier de la Cueva, José Luis Pardo, Alberto López Cuenca, Isidoro Valcárcel Medina. Museo Nacional Centro de Arte Reina Sofía, Madrid, 2015,   NIPO: 036-15-006-1
 Daniel G. Andújar: Naturaleza vigilada. Überwachte Natur. Museo Vostell Malpartida, Cáceres, 2015, Deposito legal Cc-285-2015.

References 
 
 Hans D. Christ, Iris Dressler (Hrsg.): Technologies To The People.  "Postcapital Archive (1989–2001)" Daniel Garcia Andujar, Hatje Cantz Verlag, Ostfildern 2011

External links 

Technologies To The People
Ways of working. Interview with Iris Dressler
 Oral Memories Video Daniel García Andújar
 Metrópolis RTVE Video Daniel García Andújar

Projects links 
 Artist site
 Postcapital
 e-barcelona
 e-valencia
 e-sevilla 
 e-madrid
 e-stuttgart
 e-seoul
 Irational

1966 births
Living people
Artists from Catalonia
Spanish contemporary artists